Javier Arnaldo Portillo Martínez (born 10 June 1981 in Morolica, Choluteca, Honduras) is a Honduran professional football player who plays as a left midfielder for Liga Nacional club Olimpia and the Honduras national football team.

Club career

Vida
Portillo joined Vida in December 2010 signing a six-month deal contract with the club. He made his league debut on 15 January 2011, starting in an away 1–0 victory against the league champion Real España.

Olimpia
On 6 May 2011, Portillo moved to Olimpia as a free transfer signing a two-year deal contract with the club. He made his official debut for the club in the CONCACAF Champions League with a 3–1 defeat against Santos Laguna.

International career
On 20 May 2011, Portillo was included by Luis Fernando Suarez in Honduras's 23-man squad for the 2011 CONCACAF Gold Cup. On the 26th, he made his debut in a friendly draw against El Salvador.

References

External links
 
 
 

1981 births
Living people
People from Choluteca Department
Association football midfielders
Honduran footballers
Honduras international footballers
2011 CONCACAF Gold Cup players
2014 Copa Centroamericana players
Hispano players
F.C. Motagua players
C.D.S. Vida players
C.D. Olimpia players
Liga Nacional de Fútbol Profesional de Honduras players